Point of Entry is the seventh studio album by English heavy metal band Judas Priest, released on 27 February 1981 by Columbia Records. Following the commercial success of their previous album British Steel (1980), Priest pursued a more radio-friendly direction on Point of Entry. Following the conclusion of the British Steel Tour, the band began work on their next project. By this time, the band possessed sufficient funds to fly all their equipment to the state-of-the-art Ibiza Studios in Spain. This gave Point of Entry a louder, stronger, more "live" sound than previous Judas Priest albums.

Promotion
Three singles were released from the album: "Heading Out to the Highway", "Don't Go" and "Hot Rockin, all of which had accompanying music videos. The song "Heading Out to the Highway" has been a staple in live shows since its release, "Desert Plains" was regularly played throughout the 1980s and in 2002 and "Hot Rockin was returned to the setlist for the 2005 Reunited Tour, where Priest also played "Solar Angels" on rare occasions. On the World Wide Blitz Tour of 1981 supporting Point of Entry, "Solar Angels" had been the opening song of every show, while "Troubleshooter" was also performed on parts of the supporting tour. On the contrary, five songs from the album – "Don't Go", "Turning Circles", "You Say Yes", "All the Way" and "On the Run" – have never been performed live.

Cover art
The European distribution of the album featured "an intriguing and colorful sort of futuristic metal wing over a horizon shot" designed by Roslav Szaybo, who had done all of the band's CBS albums to date. The cover featured on the Canada, USA, Australasia, Brazil, Hong Kong and Japan markets, however, was designed by Columbia Record's John Berg, and instead depicted continuous stationary paper to simulate the line in the middle of the road with white cardboard boxes on the back. "The sleeve was awful," guitarist Glen Tipton said of the covers, "and we've got to blame management for that because they didn't shop around enough to get one that was suitable. The American cover was different, but that turned out to be even worse!'" The latter version was once again used for the 2001 remaster of the album. 

The American artwork also saw the introduction of the extruded '3D' Judas Priest logo, which would be used up to Turbo.

Reissues
The album was remastered in 2001, with two bonus tracks added, a live version of "Desert Plains" and "Thunder Road", a track from the Ram It Down sessions.

In the booklet of the Remastered CD, the band states:

Critical reception

In 2005, Point of Entry was ranked number 352 in Rock Hard magazine's book The 500 Greatest Rock & Metal Albums of All Time. In the 2007 book Metal: The Definitive Guide, author Garry Sharpe-Young wrote that the album consists of "radio-friendly fillers." Moreover, Sharpe-Young called the original British artwork "bland" and subsequent American alternative artwork "an even worse compromise."

Opinions about the album from within the band have been mixed. Ian Hill has stated, "It came across… people think it's just a commercial album. And it's not, there are some good songs in there. And I think it's overlooked.". In a Louder article, it is noted that "Halford admits to being "dismayed" by the reaction it received." In the same Louder article, K.K. Downing takes on a more mixed perspective, stating, "People don't understand how pressurised we were by the label, either to do covers or make hits", he says. "With that album, we gave them what they wanted."

Track listing

Personnel
Judas Priest
Rob Halford – vocals
K. K. Downing – guitars
Glenn Tipton – guitars
Ian Hill – bass
Dave Holland – drums

Production
Produced by Judas Priest and Tom Allom
Engineered by Louis Austin
Mixed by Tom Allom
Mastered by Ray Staff
UK cover design by Rosław Szaybo
US cover design by John Berg, photography by Art Kane

Charts

Weekly charts

Year-end charts

Certifications

References

1981 albums
Albums produced by Tom Allom
Columbia Records albums
Judas Priest albums